Phulpati dance is performed in Malwa region of India. This dance is performed by unmarried girls. It is performed on the occasion of Holi.

References

Dances of India
Holi
Culture of Madhya Pradesh